Stergios Pappos (born 10 November 1972) is a Greek snowboarder. He competed in the men's giant slalom event at the 1998 Winter Olympics.

References

External links
 

1972 births
Living people
Greek male snowboarders
Olympic snowboarders of Greece
Snowboarders at the 1998 Winter Olympics
Place of birth missing (living people)